Sh'af Bayhan is a Mountain in Saudi Arabia. 

The mountain is located in  Sarawat Ranges, 'Asir Region at 18°38′45″N 42°13′43″. The mountain peak is 2,788 m above sea level.

References

Mountains of Saudi Arabia